Ready to Roll is the fifth studio album by American singer Chi Coltrane, released in 1983 by German label Teldec. "I'm Gonna Make You Love Me" was the sole single to be released from the album.

Critical reception

In a retrospective review for AllMusic, critic Charles Donovan described the album as a "mixed bag", concluding that "Her vocal performance is as committed and passionate as ever, and the piano playing that isn't buried in a soup of synthesizers certainly shines, but the songs fall short of expectations."

Track listing

Personnel
Credits are adapted from the Ready to Roll liner notes.
 Chi Coltrane – producer
 Larry Brown – engineer
 Larry R. Craycraft – design
 George Goad – illustration; cover
 Alberto Venzago – front cover photography
 Norman Seeff – inner sleeve photography

References

External links
 

Chi Coltrane albums
1983 albums
Pop rock albums by American artists